Polly Carver-Kimm is a television personality in the Des Moines, Iowa area.

She was a DJ on KIOA for approximately 20 years, through July 2007. She subsequently was hired to do communications for the Iowa Department of Public Health.

Carver-Kimm has also hosted the televised multi-state Powerball lottery drawing when Mike Pace was on vacation. (The original Powerball emcee, Pace, retired from hosting the twice-weekly drawings, as the regular drawing venue moved to Florida, which hosted the game's drawings beginning January 7, 2009.)

References

People from Des Moines, Iowa
Living people
Year of birth missing (living people)